Li Cheuk Hon (born 21 February 2000) is a Hong Kong professional footballer.

Career statistics

Club

Notes

References

Living people
2000 births
Hong Kong footballers
Association football defenders
Hong Kong Premier League players
R&F (Hong Kong) players